Mark Edmondson was the defending champion, but lost in the second round this year.

John Alexander won the title, defeating Tim Mayotte 6–3, 6–4 in the final.

Seeds

  Johan Kriek (second round)
  Mark Edmondson (second round)
  Roscoe Tanner (second round)
  John Sadri (second round)
  Vincent Van Patten (first round)
  Hank Pfister (second round)
  Chris Lewis (first round)
  Tim Mayotte (final)

Draw

Finals

Top half

Bottom half

External links
 Main draw

1982 Grand Prix (tennis)
1982 Bristol Open